Gholada is a village in Bhatar CD block in Bardhaman Sadar North subdivision of Purba Bardhaman district in the state of West Bengal, India with total 387 families residing.

History
Census 2011 Gholada Village Location Code or Village Code 319774. The village of Gholada is located in the Bhatar tehsil of Burdwan district in West Bengal, India.

Transport 

Population 
Schedule Tribe (ST) constitutes 5.24% while Schedule Caste (SC) were 0.07% of total population in Gholada village.

Population and house data

Healthcare
Nearest Rural Hospital at Bhatar (with 60 beds) is the main medical facility in Bhatar CD block. There are primary health centers..

References 

Villages in Purba Bardhaman district